Pisces is the name of different fictional characters appearing in American comic books published by Marvel Comics.

Publication history
The original Pisces first appeared in Avengers #72 (January 1970), and was created by Roy Thomas and Sal Buscema.

The character subsequently appears in Avengers #120-123 (February–May 1974), Ghost Rider #7 (August 1974), Iron Man #184 (July 1984), and West Coast Avengers #26 (November 1987), in which he is killed.

Pisces appeared as part of the "Zodiac" entry in the Official Handbook of the Marvel Universe Deluxe Edition #20.

Fictional character biography

Noah Perricone

Noah Perricone is a founding member of the Zodiac, and his base of operations was Miami, Florida. The Zodiac Cartel was founded by Cornelius van Lunt (Taurus), handpicking the eleven other members; van Lunt concealed his own identity, while he was the only one who knew the identities of the others. Each member was based in a different American city as part of his nationwide criminal network, with the ultimate goal of world economic and political domination.

The Zodiac was infiltrated by Nick Fury, posing as Scorpio; the Zodiac fought the Avengers and escaped. Led by Taurus, the Zodiac later attempted to kill all Manhattan residents born under the sign of Gemini as a show of power, but were thwarted by the Avengers. Taurus's faction attempted to kill the Zodiac dissident faction, but all twelve leaders were captured by the Avengers. A new android version of the Zodiac later appeared, led by Scorpio in a new android body, massacred the human Zodiac, and took over their criminal operations.

Life Model Decoy Pisces
A second Pisces was a Life Model Decoy created by Scorpio (Jacob Fury) in his "Theatre Of Genetics" to be part of his Zodiac crime organization. Scorpio planned to use the LMD's to serve as members of his own Zodiac organization. The Capricorn and Pisces androids, however, died due to imperfections soon after their activation.

Third Pisces
After the "death" of the first Pisces LMD, Scorpio created a second version of the Pisces LMD. This version of Pisces, along with the other members of the Zodiac LMD's, joined under Quicksilver during his bout with temporary insanity to battle the Avengers for their imagined wrongdoings.

Pisces joined Aquarius, Capricorn and Sagittarius at the "Ant-Hill", an abandoned Sentinel factory. Pisces ended up facing off against Thor, and was destroyed when Thor crushed it beneath a giant piece of machinery.

Female Pisces
After the destruction of both previous male versions of Pisces, Scorpio created a female Pisces. She arranged the ambush in which the android Zodiac killed all of the remaining human Zodiac leaders except Cornelius van Lunt, alias Taurus. Immediately afterward, Van Lunt sought out the services of the Avengers' West Coast branch to confront and defeat the android Zodiac. In their initial foray, the Avengers failed, although several androids were destroyed.

The Zodiac Key immediately resurrected the Scorpio LMD. Claiming superiority and believing that the Zodiac would eventually kill the Avengers as the androids could never be stopped, Scorpio wanted to use the Key to transport everyone on the scene to the Key's native dimension where the conflict, he believed, could be prolonged indefinitely. However, when the androids were in the other dimension, they ceased to function because each of them were aligned with a particular zodiacal energy, energy that did not exist in the other dimension. The Avengers found Hawkeye and Tigra had been sent to the same dimension and, reunited, the team was sent back to Earth by the Brotherhood. However, secretly the Brotherhood waited so that someday they could also send the Key to Earth again and create new conflicts for them.

Ecliptic Pisces
Pisces was one of the first members of the Zodiac. Pisces was confident and a calming influence on some of the more headstrong Zodiac members. Her calling Guardian ‘mammal’ suggests she was something other than human. Pisces was the lover of Sagittarius. She was killed with the rest of the Zodiac by Weapon X.

Thanos' Pisces
The sixth Pisces is an unnamed male that Thanos recruited to join his incarnation of the Zodiac. He and the other Zodiac members perish when Thanos abandons them on the self-destructing Helicarrier where Cancer was the only survivor.

Powers and abilities
Pisces is a skilled underwater combatant and wore a special outfit specifically designed for underwater combat.

The first android Pisces has a set of gills that allow her to breathe underwater. In its second form, Pisces possessed super-strength and durability. In its third form, Pisces fins, gills, and scales to assist in underwater combat and an ability to produce a watery mist from its body. She exhibits a personality based on the Pisces sign and claims to have prophetic dreams.

Ecliptic's Pisces possesses the ability to transform into water and is always in her watery form. She can surround her enemies with water and fire a blast of water. She also can alter the appearance of her human form and possesses the Zodiac teleportation device.

The sixth Pisces wears a special suit that enables him to assume a fish-like appearance.

In other media
 Pisces appears in The Avengers: United They Stand as a female piscine alien and member of Zodiac.
 Pisces appears in the Marvel Anime: Iron Man episode "Technical Difficulties" as a computer virus with a blue shark-like avatar that was the result of research meant to convert a human's will into programming code controlled by the digitized mind of a boy named Sho (voiced by Kenichi Suzumura in the Japanese version and by Michael Sinterniklaas in the English dub), who was approached by Zodiac member Ho Yinsen to use the virus on Zodiac's behalf and destroy Tony Stark's "evil ambitions". Sho targets the Arc Station systems, taking them over before doing the same to Tokyo's computers and technology and threatening to crash two JSDF fighter jets to force Stark to remove his computer defenses and let Pisces infect the Arc Station. However, Stark gets the virus into his Iron Man armor to engage Sho in a battle of wills. Upon hearing Stark's promise to protect people, Sho remembers the promise he made to his late mother to protect others. Realizing his mistake, he makes the Pisces virus delete itself.

References

External links
 
 

Characters created by Roy Thomas
Characters created by Sal Buscema
Comics characters introduced in 1970
Fictional characters from Miami
Marvel Comics supervillains